The Bréguet 460 Vultur was a French bomber of the 1930s. Few of these twin-engined monoplanes and its variant, the Breguet 462 Bréguet , were built. At least one Breguet 460 was sold to the Spanish Republican Air Force during the Spanish Civil War.

Development and design
The Bréguet 460 was a bomber, initially labelled as Multiplace de Combat, a multifunctional aircraft, by the French aviation authorities. Eventually the prototype was modified in 1934, departing from the parameters set for its predecessor, the Breguet 413, in order to meet the requirements of a high-speed bomber for the French Air Force.

The resulting aircraft was a monoplane fitted with two powerful radial Gnome et Rhône 14Kjrs engines, having a more aerodynamic appearance, although it kept the tail of the obsolete Breguet 413. Owing to technical difficulties, production was delayed and when the first prototype of the Bréguet 460 Vultur flew, it could not achieve the  required for a high-speed bomber. Thus, the French Air Ministry lost interest in this unit and concentrated on projects by other companies, such as the Amiot 340 and the LeO 45. These aircraft, however, would not be ready until three years later.

Operational history
The outbreak of the Spanish Civil War provided the French aircraft industry with a good opportunity both for getting rid of obsolete aircraft and for testing new developments. Therefore, it is in this context that the Bréguet 460 prototypes ended up in the Spanish Republican Air Force. One of the units seen in a picture of the Spanish conflict has an improved, more modern tail of the same type that would be used later for the Breguet 470 Fulgur airliner. 

The number and the fate of the Bréguet 460 Vultur units in the Spanish Republican Air Force are obscure as is common with most of the flying units of the loyalist air arm during the conflict. It is known that one of these aircraft was based at the Celrà airfield towards the end of the conflict and that it belonged to the Night Flight Group no. 11, which comprised the Vultur and two Bloch MB.210. This particular Breguet 460 crashed in the sea near L'Escala and all the crew perished in the crash.

The Bréguet Br 462 was a modernized version of the Bréguet 460, although still very similar, that made its first test flight towards the end of 1936. Flight described it as similar to the Bréguet 461 that was supplied to Japan in 1935. Bombload was 1076 kg. Defensive armament was a forward-firing  cannon and two rear-firing machine guns.

Only three Bréguet 462s were built. Two of them served in the Vichy French Air Force where they did not see much action and were scrapped in 1942.

Variants
Bre 460 
Light bomber and strike aircraft with two Gnome-Rhône 14Kdrs1 radial engines. One prototype built.
Bre 460 M5  
1935 design. Light bomber and strike aircraft powered by two Gnome-Rhône 14Kdrs radial engines. One prototype built.
Br 462 B4  
A modernized version of the Bre 460. Only three built

Operators

Armée de l'Air

Spanish Republican Air Force

Specifications

See also

References

Bibliography

External links

Airwar - Breguet 460
Aircraft that took part in the Spanish Civil War 
Spanish Civil War Picture

1930s French bomber aircraft
 0460
Aircraft first flown in 1935
Twin piston-engined tractor aircraft
Low-wing aircraft